Beach volleyball was introduced at the 1998 Central American and Caribbean Games in Maracaibo, Venezuela.

Men's Medalists

Women's Medalists

See also
 Volleyball at the Central American and Caribbean Games

References

External links
 Norceca

 
Beach volleyball
Central American and Caribbean Games